Jane Eyre is a six-part 1956 British TV adaptation of the 1847 novel by Charlotte Brontë. Unlike most BBC programming of the 1950s, the series survives intact, but has not been shown publicly in years. A 55 second clip from the second episode is available on BBC iPlayer.

Cast
Daphne Slater as Jane Eyre
Stanley Baker as Mr. Rochester
Philip Howard as Footman John
Dorothy Black as The Mad Woman

References

External links

1956 British television series debuts
1950s British drama television series
English-language television shows
Black-and-white British television shows
Films based on Jane Eyre
1950s British television miniseries